Let's Make Clothes is an Australian television series. 

It was broadcast on Melbourne station HSV-7 from 29 July to 14 October 1959. In the series, Joyce Turner and Dorothy Bradfield demonstrated methods of making dresses at home. It was common at the time for Australian daytime TV series to air in only a single city, which was the case with Let's Make Clothes. The archival status of the series is not known.

See also
Strictly for Mothers - Another 1959 daytime series on HSV-7

References

External links
Let's Make Clothes at IMDb

Seven Network original programming
1959 Australian television series debuts
1959 Australian television series endings
Australian non-fiction television series
Black-and-white Australian television shows
English-language television shows